Vishwanath Tamasker was an Indian politician from the state of the Madhya Pradesh.
He represented Durg Vidhan Sabha constituency of undivided Madhya Pradesh Legislative Assembly by winning the General election of 1957.

References 

People from Madhya Pradesh
Madhya Pradesh MLAs 1957–1962
Year of birth missing
Year of death missing